"Infection" is the fourth episode of the first season of the science fiction television series, Babylon 5. "Infection" was the first script written for a regular Babylon 5 episode.

Plot
Dr Vance Hendricks, a former college lecturer of Dr Franklin, visits him while he is checking on the cause of recent death of a Babylon 5 customs worker. Hendricks tells Franklin that while excavating the long-dead planet Ikarra VII for the corporation Interplanetary Expeditions, they had come across some artifacts that they determined were organic in nature, and something that humanity has been trying to develop themselves. Hendricks has Nelson, his assistant, bring the artifacts in, but Franklin expresses concern that they have not been properly put through quarantine; Hendricks assures him that they were processed prior to arriving on the station. As Nelson prepares the artifacts for examination, he is hit him with an energy surge emanating from one of the artifacts. Over the next several hours, his body starts transforming, and unseen by the others, takes one of the devices and attaches it to himself.

The station staff, still investigating the sudden death of the customs worker, start to detect energy spikes on the station. Franklin and Hendricks realize that the Ikarra artifacts have infected Nelson and are transforming him into a weapon. Franklin studies the remaining artifacts to learn that the Ikarran people had developed these bio-weapons to fend off invaders to their planets, telling them protect the planet from anyone that was not a "pure" Ikarran. While the weapons held off the invaders, this instruction caused the weapons to turn on the Ikarrans since there was no such thing as a "pure" Ikarran. Nelson has now been transformed into one of these weapons, and will rampage through Babylon 5, gaining power over time.

Franklin explains the situation to Commander Sinclair while the station is being put into lockdown. Sinclair decides to face the weapon alone, explaining how they had wiped out their creators because they could not determine what a pure Ikarran was. The weapon pulls off the device from its armor and crushes it before collapsing, returning Nelson back to normal. Back in medbay, Franklin assures Nelson is fine, but confronts Hendricks knowing that he had instructed Nelson to smuggle the Ikarra artifacts aboard; it was Nelson's intent to kill the customs worker which allowed the Ikarran artifacts to take over his body. Hendricks is arrested, while EarthForce arrives to acquire the weapons for their own bioweapons division.

Production, Visual and Sound Effects 
The Babylon 5 makeup department involved in this episode – consisting of Everett Burrell, Greg Funk, Mary Kay Morse, Ron Pipes and John Vulich – won the 1994 Emmy Award for Outstanding Individual Achievement in Makeup for a Series for episode 5 of the season, The Parliament of Dreams.

Vance Hendricks was played by Scottish actor David McCallum, who is known for his portrayal of Soviet agent Kuryakin in The Man from U.N.C.L.E. McCallum also starred in The Great Escape and The Greatest Story Ever Told.

Vance's assistant, Nelson Drake, was played by Marshall Teague, who would later in the series play the recurring character Ta'Lon. At the end of the series, Ta'Lon would take over from G'Kar as Narn ambassador to Babylon 5.

Makeup designer Everett Burrell recalled the department dressing Teague up in the suit from the episode: "No one had seen it yet and it was pretty scary looking. So we found out that [Producer John Copeland] and J.M.S were having some intense production meeting. [...]Teague who was in the suit kicked the door open right in the middle of the big meeting. Everybody there jumped up and tried to escape, including J.M.S. I peeked around the corner and Copeland's eyes were as big as saucers. I waited for him to either get mad or fire us, but he just started laughing..." 

For its visual effects scenes, Babylon 5 pioneered the use of computer-generated imagery (CGI) scenes – instead of using more expensive physical models – in a television series.<ref name="Britt">{{cite web |url=https://www.syfy.com/syfywire/5-things-babylon-5-did-that-changed-science-fiction-forever |title=5 Things that Babylon 5 did that changed science fiction forever. |last=Britt |first=Ryan |date=11 July 2019 |website=www.syfy.com |publisher=SYFY Media LLC. |access-date= |url-status=dead |archive-url=https://web.archive.org/web/20211009164702/https://www.syfy.com/syfywire/5-things-babylon-5-did-that-changed-science-fiction-forever |archive-date= 2021-10-09 |quote=And though this may seem shocking now, in the early and mid-'90s, CGI was not the default for sci-fi special effects. Most big sci-fi shows and movies (like Star Trek) all still used physical models, which are notoriously more expensive. But all of Babylon 5'''s spaceships and space stations were made in a computer.}}</ref> This also enabled motion effects which are difficult to create using models, such as the rotation of fighter craft along multiple axes, or the rotation and banking of a virtual camera. The visual effects were created by Foundation Imaging using 24 Commodore Amiga 2000 computers with Lightwave 3D software and Video Toaster cards, 16 of which were dedicated to rending each individual frame of CGI, with each frame taking on average 45 minutes to render. In-house resource management software managed the workload of the Amiga computers to ensure that no machine was left idle during the image rendering process.

Music for the title sequence and the episode was provided by the series' composer, Christopher Franke. Franke developed themes for each of the main characters, the station, for space in general, and for the alien races, endeavoring to carry a sense of the character of each race.

Writing
As Babylon 5 was conceived with an overall five-year story arc, the episode was written as both an individual story and with another level, where the hints of the larger story arc were given. The series' creator, J. Michael Straczynski indicates that the episodes can be watched for the individual stories, the character stories, or the story arc.

Straczynski, who wrote this episode first out of all the Babylon 5 scripts, felt that the episode was possibly the weakest episode in the season. As nearly a year had passed since the pilot episode had been filmed, he felt it was difficult to find the "fingerprints" of the characters again. Straczynski writes, "As on  show, it takes a while to get up to speed once you hit series. That was the real problem, and there wasn't any real way to get past it except to write it, re-acquaint myself with the characters, and move on. I probably would have opted out of doing it had we had more scripts on hand, but we didn't. And oddly, many on the production team  the script quite a lot, and kept saying it had to be done."

Reviews

Rowan Kaiser, writing in The A.V. Club, writes that, despite the poor plot, 'Infection' manages to salvage itself by the end of the episode, with a few defining character moments. He points out the scene where Garibaldi confronts Sinclair about his over-willingness to risk his life: "'I think they're looking for something worth dying for because it's easier than finding something worth living for.' It's not just an examination of the protagonist's motivations, it's also a reminder of just how bad [t]he Battle Of The Line was, and how little we know about it."

Kaiser also highlights out the scene where Dr Franklin and Ivanova discuss the rising xenophobic sentiment on Earth, followed by a confirmation of their fears: EarthForce security arrives to confiscate the organic weaponry for its own bioweapons division. Kaiser writes, "Even though 'Infection' is a Star Trek-like episode, with a patriarchal captain solving a violent situation through diplomacy and application of logic, there’s still a moment where Babylon 5 builds its darker, more serialized universe a tiny bit."

Elias Rosner, writing in Multiversity Comics'', sums up: "The politics of Earth start to catch up to Sinclair, a weapon based in eugenics is unleashed, and the corporations rear their ugly head. Welcome my friends. This is the story of the last of the Babylon stations."

Rosner also points out the scene where Garibaldi calls out Sinclair on his death wish, as a "great, small moment of characterization." He writes, "[W]hile initially it didn't seem all that out of the ordinary, having [Garibaldi] vocalize it reframes these earlier actions. [...It] wasn't telegraphed as a, this is a problem, but instead stewed in the background and only someone who knows Sinclair for a long time, would have picked up on it."

References

External links

 Actor Marshall Teague wearing the unfinished Ikarran war machine body suit in a fitting and movement test.

Babylon 5 episodes
1994 American television episodes